TCDD DE22000 are 86 mainline locomotives built for the Turkish State Railways by TÜLOMSAŞ under license by General Motors Electro-Motive Diesel, based on the EMD G26CW-2. The locomotives use GM's 16 cylinder, direct injection 16 645E engine, AR10/D18 AC alternator and a D77-DC traction motor. 

The DE22000 are usually used for freight transport but are also used frequently for passenger transport. The locomotives main characteristic were that they were the first locomotive in Turkey to have multiple unit (MU) capabilities. This allowed 2 or more to be coupled and used for head-end power, however not all locomotives have this capability.

References

External links
 Trains of Turkey page on DE22000

Tülomsaş locomotives
Co-Co locomotives
Turkish State Railways diesel locomotives
Standard gauge locomotives of Turkey
Railway locomotives introduced in 1985